Phiwaba Madokwe is a South African politician who has been a Member of the National Assembly for the Economic Freedom Fighters since 22 October 2020. Madokwe had previously served as the secretary-general of the EFF Student Command.

Career
In June 2015, Madokwe was elected secretary-general of the student command of the Economic Freedom Fighters.

In March 2019, Madokwe was announced as a parliamentary candidate of the EFF for the 2019 general election. She was not elected to parliament at the election in May 2019. In July 2019, Muzi Khozi succeeded her as secretary-general. She was elected to the EFF's central command team, the party's highest-decision making body, in December 2019.

On 22 October 2020, Madokwe entered the National Assembly as a replacement for Peter Keetse.

References

External links

Ms Phiwaba Madokwe at Parliament of South Africa

Living people
Year of birth missing (living people)
Economic Freedom Fighters politicians
Members of the National Assembly of South Africa
Women members of the National Assembly of South Africa